Burglauenen railway station is a railway station in the municipality of Grindelwald in the Swiss canton of Bern. The station is on the Berner Oberland Bahn, whose trains operate services to Interlaken Ost and Grindelwald. It takes its name from the nearby settlement of Burglauenen.

Services 
 the following rail services stop at Burglauenen:

References

External links 
 
 

Railway stations in the canton of Bern
Bernese Oberland Railway stations
Railway stations in Switzerland opened in 1890